Nicolas David Muzin is a Canadian-American Republican political strategist, attorney and physician.  He was a paid consultant for The Nation of Qatar. Prior to that, he served as the director of coalitions for the United States House Republican Conference and was a senior adviser and deputy chief of staff for Republican candidate for President of the United States Sen. Ted Cruz. After the 2016 elections, he went on to work as a lobbyist, filing and registering under FARA as a foreign agent, first for the Democratic (opposition) party of Albania.

Early life
Muzin was raised in a Jewish family in Toronto, Ontario, and is the son of Helen and Gary Muzin.  His father is the president of a construction distribution and supply company.

Education
Muzin attended Ner Israel Yeshiva High School in Toronto.  After spending some post-high school time at the Talmudical Yeshiva of Philadelphia, he attended Yeshiva University in the Washington Heights section of Manhattan.  While there, he served as editor in chief of the school newspaper, The Commentator, graduating in 1997.  Muzin then completed Albert Einstein College of Medicine on a full four-year scholarship in 2001.  Following a year as an internal medicine intern, Muzin proceeded to Yale Law School. At Yale, Nicolas was a member of the Jewish leadership society Shabtai.

Career

Early career 
In 2000, Muzin supported the Al Gore / Joe Lieberman ticket. He joined George W. Bush's 2004 reelection campaign as counsel for the Republican National Committee and served as a medical adviser for the 2008 presidential campaign of Sen. John McCain. From 2005 to 2008, Muzin was of council at Williams & Connolly.

Work with Tim Scott 
Dr. Muzin was chief of staff and policy adviser for then Charleston City Councilmember Tim Scott during his successful 2010 campaign for US Congress following the retirement of Rep. Henry Brown. Muzin served as Scott's chief of staff until December 2011. Muzin was “instrumental in paving Scott’s way” and Scott revealed “without Muzin’s entreaties…[he] may not have run for the Charleston-area House seat that opened.” Nick Muzin arrayed on his dining room table what would turn out to be the winning strategy to elect the first black Republican to Congress from South Carolina in more than a century. “Initially, I was fairly reluctant. I did not have my sights set on Washington,” Scott said. “He was crucial in helping me to get to that conclusion.”

Muzin and Scott bonded over health policy, and interest in each other's beliefs. “The close alliance – and friendship — between a black Tea Party Republican from the South and an Orthodox doctor-lawyer from Canada is a rarity in politics, and upends perceptions about how blacks and Jews interact.” Scott, in a state where the Jewish vote barely registered, released a statement in support of Israel after the May 2010 clash with a Gaza-bound flotilla. Scott's focus on and support of Israel, which has remained throughout his entire career, even made it into an “Saturday Night Live” skit.

The end of 2012 saw promotions for both Muzin and Scott. Muzin became the director of strategy and coalitions for the House Republican Conference for the 113th Congress, and Scott was appointed to the U.S. Senate by South Carolina Governor Nikki Haley. Muzin remained involved with Scott during his transition from the House to his current position in the Senate, and Muzin became the national political director for the Washington D.C. political action committee Tomorrow is Meaningful (TIM-PAC). Recently established by Tim Scott. TIM-PAC focuses on encouraging entrepreneurship, private market-driven health care, tax reform, strengthening ties with longtime U.S. ally Israel, and an additional aim of sourcing viable candidates to bolster the Tea Party movement's political base.  

In 2013, Dr. Muzin successfully performed the Heimlich maneuver on Congressman Ted Poe, saving his life after the congressman started choking on a piece of popcorn.

Work with Ted Cruz 
Recruited by Chad Sweet, national campaign chairman for Sen. Ted Cruz,<ref>Mishpacha Magazine Inside the Cruz Campaign, December 23, 2015</ref> Muzin served as senior advisor and deputy chief of staff for strategy for Cruz's Republican candidacy for President of the United States in the 2016 election.  Cruz stated that he used Muzin as a sounding board on issues related to Judaism and to gain a deeper understanding of the religion and the broader community.

In July 2016, Muzin was considered by Yeshiva University, his alma mater, for the position of university president.Yeshiva U Search Committee to Propose Instructor at Settlement College as Next President

 Donald Trump Administration 
During the 2017 legislative session, Muzin played a key role in the passage of the First Step Act, a major piece of criminal justice legislation. It was a particularly difficult time for criminal justice reform, and among the most important holdouts on the Republican side at the time was Texas senator Ted Cruz. The key to reaching Cruz was Muzin, who "arranged a conference call which included long-time Cruz supporters, prominent Texan rabbinic leaders, influential legal figures like Alan Dershowitz, former attorney general Michael Mukasey, and conservative thought leaders, with multiple speakers covering the issue from personal, religious, moral, policy, and legal perspectives." Just over a week later, on December 7 — which, Muzin observes, “was Shabbos Parshas Mikeitz, when we read of Yosef being released from prison” — Cruz announced his support for the legislation. With Cruz's change of heart and that of a few others, the First Step Act passed with an overwhelming majority of 87–12. The First Step Act was backed by a remarkable coalition of conservative and liberal groups, and its passage is one of the rare bipartisan successes of this time period.

In February 2018, it was reported by Haaretz and The Times of Israel'' that the Qatari Government had hired Nick Muzin to improve the Emirates's relations with the Trump Administration and the Jewish American community. Muzin's work reportedly included arranging meetings between Qatari officials and leaders of Jewish and pro-Israel advocacy groups. In September 2017, "Muzin registered with the Justice Department as a foreign agent for Qatar."

Muzin and Joey Allaham introduced Qataris to prominent American Jewish figures and offered them trips to Doha to meet with the Emir of Qatar and other prominent government officials. American Jewish leaders who accepted trips organized by Allaham and Muzin included Alan Dershowitz, head of the Zionist Organization of America Mort Klein, and Malcolm Hoenlein.On June 6, 2018, Muzin declared on Twitter that he had stopped working for Qatar.

Recent Business 
Nicolas Muzin is the Founder and Chairman of Stonington Global, a specialized law and consulting firm based in Washington, where he focuses on strategic international advisory and private equity work and practices as an attorney. The firm provides programming services to Voice of America Persian, the American government-backed media outlet that produces journalistic content for the Iranian community. Stonington Global also works on pro bono issues related to criminal justice reform, religious freedom and human rights.

In December 2020, Nick Muzin, Alan Dershowitz, and other criminal justice reform advocates helped seek clemency for Eliyahu (“Eli”) Weinstein, who was sentenced to 24 years in prison for fraudulent real estate transactions, the longest sentence in the history of New Jersey for such an offense. In January, President Trump commuted Weinstein's sentence to time served, and wrote “Mr. Weinstein is the father of seven children and a loving husband…Upon his release, he will have strong support from his community and members of his faith. The New York Times wrote that Muzin and Dershowitz's "combination of access, influence and substantive expertise...produced striking results" in winning clemency.

Personal life
Muzin is an Orthodox Jew.

References

Living people
Canadian expatriates in the United States
Canadian lawyers
Canadian Orthodox Jews
Physicians from New York City
Jewish Canadian activists
Jewish physicians
Activists from Toronto
Canadian activists
Year of birth missing (living people)